Heikki is a Finnish and Estonian male given name. It derives from a medieval vernacular form of the name Henrik. Notable people with the name include:

Heikki Aho (footballer) (born 1983), Finnish footballer
Heikki A. Alikoski (1912–1997), Finnish astronomer
Heikki Aalto (born 1961), Finnish ice hockey player
Heikki Häiväoja (born 1929), Finnish sculptor
Heikki Haravee (1924–2003), Estonian actor
Heikki Holmås (born 1972), Norwegian politician
Heikki Ikola (born 1947), Finnish biathlete
Heikki Jaansalu (born 1959), Estonian sports shooter
Heikki Koort (1955–2021), Estonian diplomat, sports figure and actor
Heikki Kovalainen (born 1981), Finnish former Formula One driver
 Heikki Kyöstilä (born 1946), Finnish billionaire, founder, owner and president of dental equipment maker Planmeca
Heikki L, real name Heikki Liimatainen, Finnish house music producer
Heikki Liimatainen (athlete) (1894–1980), Finnish athlete
Heikki Kähkönen (1891–1962), Finnish wrestler
Heikki Mäkelä (born 1946), Finnish sprint canoer
Heikki Mikkola (born 1945), Finnish motocross racer
Heikki Nurmio (1887–1947), Finnish jäger and writer
Heikki Paasonen (presenter) (born 1983), Finnish television presenter
Heikki Savolainen (gymnast) (1907–1997), Finnish artistic gymnast
Heikki Siren (1918–2013), Finnish architect
Heikki Vääräniemi (born 1969), Finnish pole vaulter
Heikki Westerinen (born 1944), Finnish chess player

See also
Henrik